Our Neighbors – The Carters is a 1939 American comedy film directed by Ralph Murphy and written by S.K. Lauren. The film stars Fay Bainter, Frank Craven, Edmund Lowe, Genevieve Tobin, Mary Thomas and Mildred Coles. The film was released on November 24, 1939, by Paramount Pictures.

Plot

Cast 
Fay Bainter as Ellen Carter
Frank Craven as Doc Carter
Edmund Lowe as Bill Hastings
Genevieve Tobin as Gloria Hastings
Mary Thomas as Mattie Carter
Mildred Coles as Gloria Carter
Scotty Beckett as Dickie Carter
Benny Bartlett as Junior Carter
Donald Brenon as Paul Carter
Nana Bryant as Louise Wilcox
Thurston Hall as Mr. Guilfoyle
Granville Bates as Joseph Laurence
Edward McWade as Pop Hagen
Norman Phillips Jr. as Henry Laurence 
Richard Clayton as Peter Bush
Frank Reicher as Dr. Proser

References

External links 
 

1936 films
American black-and-white films
Films directed by Ralph Murphy
Paramount Pictures films
American comedy films
1936 comedy films
1939 comedy films
1939 films
1930s English-language films
1930s American films